Holmesglen may refer to:

Holmesglen Institute of TAFE, an educational institution in Melbourne, Australia
Holmesglen railway station, a railway station in Melbourne, Australia